Serhiy Volodymyrovych Kulish is a Ukrainian sport shooter. He competed at the 2012 Summer Olympics in the men's 10 metre air rifle. At the 2016 Summer Olympics in Rio, he won the silver medal in the men's 10m air rifle singles event.

Multiple champion of Ukraine (2010-2013), master of sports of Ukraine of international class (2009).

Performances at the Olympics

References

Ukrainian male sport shooters
1993 births
Living people
Sportspeople from Cherkasy
Olympic shooters of Ukraine
Shooters at the 2012 Summer Olympics
Shooters at the 2016 Summer Olympics
Shooters at the 2010 Summer Youth Olympics
European Games competitors for Ukraine
Shooters at the 2015 European Games
Medalists at the 2016 Summer Olympics
Olympic medalists in shooting
Olympic silver medalists for Ukraine
Shooters at the 2019 European Games
Shooters at the 2020 Summer Olympics